Frank Lee (1867 – 21 December 1941) was a Labour Party politician in the United Kingdom.

He was born in Tibshelf, Derbyshire and worked as a compensation agent for the Derbyshire Miners' Association, eventually becoming assistant secretary, and honorary secretary of the Derbyshire Miners' Convalescent Home at Skegness. He was also a governor of Sheffield University. He lived in Chesterfield.

At the 1922 general election, he was elected Member of Parliament (MP) for North East Derbyshire, and held the seat until 1931. He regained it in 1935 and was still the sitting member when he died in Chesterfield in 1941, aged 74.

References

 The Times, Obituary, 22 December 1941

External links 
 

1867 births
1941 deaths
Labour Party (UK) MPs for English constituencies
Miners' Federation of Great Britain-sponsored MPs
UK MPs 1922–1923
UK MPs 1923–1924
UK MPs 1924–1929
UK MPs 1929–1931
UK MPs 1935–1945
People from Tibshelf
People from Chesterfield, Derbyshire
Members of the Parliament of the United Kingdom for constituencies in Derbyshire